The Wrong Road is a 1937 American crime drama film directed by James Cruze and starring Richard Cromwell, Helen Mack, and Lionel Atwill. The film is now in the public domain.

Plot 
A young unmarried couple (Cromwell and Mack), whose plans for their life together have not turned out as expected, decide to steal $100,000 from the bank where the boyfriend works, then hide the money in a safe place and return for it after they serve out their prison sentences.

All goes according to plan until they get out of prison, when they find that they're being trailed by an insurance investigator (Atwill), who has a soft spot for the couple and would like to see them go straight, and the boyfriend's old cellmate, who wants a cut of the money.

Cast
Richard Cromwell as Jimmy Caldwell
Helen Mack as Ruth Holden
Lionel Atwill as Mike Roberts
Horace McMahon as Blackie Clayton
Russ Powell as Chief Ira Foster
Billy Bevan as McLean
Marjorie Main as Martha Foster
Rex Evans as Victor J. Holbrook
Joseph Crehan as District Attorney
Arthur Hoyt as Beamish, bank teller
Syd Saylor as Big Hobo
Selmer Jackson as Judge
Chester Clute as Dan O'Fearna

External links

1937 films
1937 crime drama films
American black-and-white films
American crime drama films
1930s English-language films
Films about bank robbery
Films directed by James Cruze
Republic Pictures films
1930s American films